Reginald Augustus Frederick Murray (18 February 1846 – 5 September 1925) was a Victorian Government geologist and surveyor-general.

Murray was born in Frimley, Surrey, England, the eldest child of Captain Virginius Murray (1817-1861) and his wife Elizabeth Alice, née Poitiers.  He went to Australia in 1855 with his mother, three years after his father. Murray was educated at Rev. T. P. Fenner's, (M.A.) private school in South Yarra, a suburb of Melbourne. Murray left school in 1860, and worked on a cattle run near Avoca, Victoria and later had some success as a gold prospector.

In April 1862 Murray joined the Geological Survey of Victoria, directed by Alfred Selwyn, as field assistant to Charles Smith Wilkinson. Murray had experience in Bacchus Marsh, Ballan, the Otway ranges, and many other districts. When the Geological Survey was terminated on economic grounds in 1869, Murray engaged in mining and mining surveying in the Ballarat district. He joined the government service again in 1871, and made geological surveys of the Bendigo and Ballarat goldfields. Murray did a lot of pioneering surveying in Gippsland much of which had not been explored; some of this was done with Alfred William Howitt.

In 1881 Murray was appointed geological surveyor for the Department of Mines, Victoria, and remained until his resignation in 1897. He afterwards held appointments with various British mining companies and in his later years did a good deal of prospecting work. In 1887 he published a capable volume, Victoria: Geology and Physical Geography, and a large number of his reports and maps will be found listed in Bulletin No. 23 of the geological survey of Victoria, p. 33. He was a hard-working and able geologist, who did excellent exploring and pioneering geological work in Victoria and particularly in relation to mining country.

Murray died in Caulfield, a suburb of Melbourne, Victoria, on 5 September 1925. He married twice and was survived by sons and daughters of both marriages.

Works

References

1925 deaths
1846 births
Australian public servants
Geologists from Melbourne